John Evans, Baron Evans of Parkside (19 October 1930, Belfast – 5 March 2016, London) was a British politician who was a Labour Party Member of Parliament (MP).

A former shipyard worker and trade unionist, he served as a member of Hebburn urban district council from 1962 until 1974 (of which he was chairman from 1973 to 1974) and South Tyneside council from 1973 to 1974.

Evans was elected to Parliament in the February 1974 general election for the Newton constituency, which he represented until it was abolished for the 1983 election.  He then served as MP for the new St Helens North constituency, which partially replaced Newton, until he stood down at the 1997 election, being succeeded by David Watts. On 10 June 1997 he was created a life peer as Baron Evans of Parkside, of St Helens in the County of Merseyside.

Evans also served as a member of the European Parliament, from 1975 until 1978.

Notes

References
 The BBC Guide to Parliament, BBC Books, 1979.  .

External links 
 

1930 births
2016 deaths
Amalgamated Engineering Union-sponsored MPs
Labour Party (UK) MPs for English constituencies
Evans of Parkside
Labour Party (UK) MEPs
UK MPs 1974
UK MPs 1974–1979
UK MPs 1979–1983
UK MPs 1983–1987
UK MPs 1987–1992
UK MPs 1992–1997
MEPs for the United Kingdom 1973–1979
Life peers created by Elizabeth II